The Journal of Mathematical Psychology is a peer-reviewed scientific journal established in 1964. It covers all areas of mathematical and theoretical psychology, including sensation and perception, psychophysics, learning and memory, problem solving, judgment and decision-making, and motivation. It is the official journal of the Society for Mathematical Psychology and is published on their behalf by Elsevier.

Abstracting and indexing 
The journal is abstracted and indexed by:

According to the Journal Citation Reports, the journal has a 2017 impact factor of 2.176.

References

External links 
 

Publications established in 1964
Mathematical and statistical psychology journals
Elsevier academic journals
Bimonthly journals
English-language journals